In enzymology, a 4-methyleneglutaminase is an enzyme that catalyzes the chemical reaction

4-methylene-L-glutamine + H2O  4-methylene-L-glutamate + NH3

Thus, the two substrates of this enzyme are 4-methylene-L-glutamine and H2O, whereas its two products are 4-methylene-L-glutamate and NH3.

This enzyme belongs to the family of hydrolases, those acting on carbon-nitrogen bonds other than peptide bonds, specifically in linear amides.  The systematic name of this enzyme class is 4-methylene-L-glutamine amidohydrolase. Other names in common use include 4-methyleneglutamine deamidase, and 4-methyleneglutamine amidohydrolase.  This enzyme participates in c5-branched dibasic acid metabolism.

References

 

EC 3.5.1
Enzymes of unknown structure